Macaduma is a genus of moths in the subfamily Arctiinae.

Distribution
The genus has its greatest diversity in the Australian tropics, extending weakly east to New Caledonia, Fiji and Samoa and west to the Himalaya.

Species
Macaduma albata Hampson, 1900
Macaduma albisparsa Hampson, 1914
Macaduma aroa Bethune-Baker, 1904
Macaduma biangulata Holloway, 1979
Macaduma bipunctata Bethune-Baker, 1904
Macaduma borneana Holloway, 2001
Macaduma castaneofusca Rothschild, 1912
Macaduma castneogriseata Rothschild, 1912
Macaduma corvina (Felder, 1875)
Macaduma costimacula (Bethune-Baker, 1908)
Macaduma cretacea Hampson, 1914
Macaduma cristata Holloway, 1979
Macaduma feliscaudata D. S. Fletcher, 1957
Macaduma foliacea Rothschild, 1912
Macaduma fuliginosa Rothschild, 1912
Macaduma fusca Hampson, 1900
Macaduma lichenia Rothschild, 1912
Macaduma macrosema Hampson, 1914
Macaduma micans Hampson, 1900
Macaduma montana Robinson, 1975
Macaduma nigripuncta Hampson, 1900
Macaduma pallicosta Rothschild, 1912
Macaduma postflavida Rothschild, 1916
Macaduma quercifolia Rothschild, 1912
Macaduma recurva Rothschild, 1915
Macaduma reducta Rothschild, 1912
Macaduma rufa Hampson, 1914
Macaduma rufoumbrata Rothschild, 1912
Macaduma samoensis Tams, 1935
Macaduma striata Robinson, 1975
Macaduma strongyla Turner, 1922
Macaduma subfoliacea Rothschild, 1916
Macaduma suffusa (Rothschild, 1913)
Macaduma tortricella Walker, 1866
Macaduma tortricoides Rothschild, 1912
Macaduma toxophora (Turner, 1899)

References

 
Heteroneura genera